Wally Russell (25 March 1923 – 4 March 1981) was  a former Australian rules footballer who played with Richmond and Geelong in the Victorian Football League (VFL). Russell was a member of 1946 Richmond Reserves premiership team.

Upon leaving Geelong, Russell was the St. Kilda Reserves Captain-Coach in 1950, playing 18 games, then went to BlackRock as  Captain-Coach in 1951–52, then onto Carrum as Captain-Coach from 1953 to 1962, winning a premiership in 1959, winning the club Best & Fairest in 1958 and he also won a league Best & Fairest award too.

Russell was captain-coach of Beechworth Seniors in the Ovens & King Football League in 1965 and retired as a player, aged 44 in 1967, as captain-coach of Beechworth Reserves.
		
Father of former Geelong footballer, Ivan Russell.

He served in the R.A.A.F, for five years during World War 2. During his service, he was stationed in Canada.

Notes

External links 
		
	
Wally Russell profile @ Tigerland Archive

1923 births
1981 deaths
Australian rules footballers from Victoria (Australia)
Richmond Football Club players
Geelong Football Club players